The 2015 Men's Junior Pan-American Volleyball Cup was the second edition of the bi-annual men's volleyball tournament, played by seven countries from June 23 – 28, 2015 in Gatineau, Canada.

Competing nations

Competition format
The competition format for the 2015 Junior Pan American Volleyball Cup divides the 7 participating teams in 2 groups (one of 3 and one of 4 teams).

The best team from Group A and Group B will advance to the semifinals, the second and third teams from Group B will play the quarterfinals against the second and third teams from Pool A.

Pool standing procedure
Match won 3–0: 5 points for the winner, 0 point for the loser
Match won 3–1: 4 points for the winner, 1 points for the loser
Match won 3–2: 3 points for the winner, 2 points for the loser
In case of tie, the teams were classified according to the following criteria:
points ratio and sets ratio

Preliminary round
All times are in Eastern Standard Time (UTC−05:00)

Group A

Group B

Final round

Championship bracket

Quarterfinals

Classification 5

Semifinals

Sixth place match

Bronze medal match

Final

Final standing

Individual awards

Most Valuable Player
 
Best Scorer
 
Best Setter
 
Best Opposite
 
Best Outside Hitters
 
 
Best Middle Blockers
 
 
Best Server
 
Best Digger
 
Best Receiver
 
Best Libero

References

External links

Men's Pan-American Volleyball Cup
Pan-American
2015 in Canadian sports
International volleyball competitions hosted by Canada